Euseius yousefi is a species of mite in the family Phytoseiidae.

References

yousefi
Articles created by Qbugbot
Animals described in 1986